Johnny Byron Peacock (born March 2, 1947) is a former American football defensive back who played two seasons with the Houston Oilers of the National Football League. He was drafted by the Houston Oilers in the fifth round of the 1969 NFL Draft. He played college football at the University of Houston and attended Goliad High School in Goliad, Texas.

References

External links
Just Sports Stats
Fanbase profile

Living people
1947 births
American football defensive backs
Houston Cougars football players
Houston Oilers players
Players of American football from Austin, Texas
American Football League players